Jeon Yu-Mi (born 11 November 1988 in Seoul) is a South Korean field hockey player. At the 2012 Summer Olympics she competed with the Korea women's national field hockey team in the women's tournament. She was part of the Korean team that won the women's hockey at the 2010 Asian Games.

References

External links
 

1988 births
Living people
South Korean female field hockey players
Asian Games medalists in field hockey
Asian Games silver medalists for South Korea
Field hockey players at the 2010 Asian Games
Field hockey players at the 2012 Summer Olympics
Medalists at the 2010 Asian Games
Olympic field hockey players of South Korea
People from Seoul
21st-century South Korean women